This article show all participating team squads at the 2007 Pan American Games, played by eight countries held in Rio de Janeiro, Brazil.

Head Coach: José Roberto Guimarães

Head Coach: Eladio Vargas

Head Coach: Antonio Perdomo

Head Coach: Beato Miguel Cruz

Head Coach: Macario González

Head Coach: Enio de Figueiredo

Head Coach: Juan Carlos Núñez

Head Coach: Susan Woodstra

See also
2007 Men's Pan American Games Volleyball Squads

References
NORCECA

2007 in volleyball
P
Events at the 2007 Pan American Games